First-seeded Jean Borotra defeated Christian Boussus 2–6, 6–4, 7–5, 6–4 in the final to win the men's singles tennis title at the 1931 French Championships.

Seeds
The seeded players are listed below. Jean Borotra is the champion; others show the round in which they were eliminated.

  Jean Borotra (champion)
  George Lott (quarterfinals)
  Christian Boussus (finalist)
  Bunny Austin (third round)
  Johnny Van Ryn (quarterfinals)
  Fred J. Perry (fourth round)
  Vernon Kirby (fourth round)
  George Lyttleton-Rogers (third round)
  Louis Raymond (third round)
  Patrick Hughes (semifinals)
  Giorgio de Stefani (quarterfinals)
  Roderich Menzel (fourth round)
  Hyotaro Sato (fourth round)
  Béla von Kehrling (third round)
  Emmanuel Du Plaix (third round)
  Hermann Artens (fourth round)

Draw

Key
 Q = Qualifier
 WC = Wild card
 LL = Lucky loser
 r = Retired

Finals

Earlier rounds

Section 1

Section 2

Section 3

Section 4

Section 5

Section 6

Section 7

Section 8

References

External links

French Championships - Men's Singles
French Championships (tennis) by year – Men's singles